María Inmaculada "Inma" Gabarro Romero (born 5 November 2002) is a Spanish professional footballer who plays as a midfielder for Liga F club Sevilla FC and the Spain women's national team.

Club career
Gabarro started her career at Sevilla FC youth ranks.

International career
Gabarro represents Spain. She won the 2022 FIFA U-20 Women's World Cup and made her senior debut on 11 November 2022, being a 72nd-minute substitution in a 7-0 friendly home win over Argentina, scoring the match last goal.

International goals

References

External links
Profile at La Liga

2002 births
Living people
People from Aljarafe
Sportspeople from the Province of Seville
Footballers from Andalusia
Spanish women's footballers
Women's association football midfielders
Sevilla FC (women) players
Primera División (women) players
Spain women's youth international footballers
Spain women's international footballers
21st-century Spanish women